{{DISPLAYTITLE:N-Isopropyl-N'-phenyl-1,4-phenylenediamine}}

N-Isopropyl-N′-phenyl-1,4-phenylenediamine (often abbreviated  IPPD) is an organic compound commonly used as an antiozonant in rubbers, particularly those used for tires. Like other p-phenylenediamine-based antiozonants it works by virtue of its low ionization energy, which allows it to react with ozone faster than ozone will react with rubber. This reaction converts it to the corresponding aminoxyl radical (R2N–O•), with the ozone being converted to a hydroperoxyl radical (HOO•), these species can then be scavenged by other antioxidant polymer stabilizers. 

IPPD is prone to process called blooming, where it migrates to the surface of the rubber. This can be beneficial to the tire, as ozone attacks the tire surface and blooming therefore moves the antiozonant to where it is most needed, however this also increases the leaching of IPPD into the environment. Many tire producers have moved to using 6PPD instead, as this migrates more slowly. Oxidation of IPPD converts the central phenylenediamine ring into a quinone.

Safety
IPPD is a human allergen. It is the compound responsible for coining the term "Volkswagen Dermatitis". There is some preliminary evidence for it being harmful to fish.

See also
 N,N′-Di-2-butyl-1,4-phenylenediamine - a phenylenediamine based antioxidant used as a fuel additive

References

Antioxidants
Diamines
Plastics additives
Isopropylamino compounds